Vignory is a commune in the Haute-Marne département in north-eastern France.

Sites and monuments
 Château de Vignory - castle built at the start of the 12th century by Guy de Vignory; classified as a monument historique in 1989.
 Église Saint-Étienne de Vignory - church whose construction began in 1032; classified as a monument historique in 1846.
 
 Picturesque streets 
 Museum and medieval-inspired garden 
 16th and 18th century houses
 Lavoir - constructed 1832

See also
Communes of the Haute-Marne department

References

External links

 

Communes of Haute-Marne